Eran Kopel is an Israeli epidemiologist. He is a senior lecturer at Sackler Faculty of Medicine’s School of Public Health and a sub-district health officer at the Petah Tikva office of the Ministry of Health (Israel).  His areas of interest are the epidemiology of infectious diseases and cardiovascular epidemiology.

Early life
Kopel received two degrees from the Hebrew University of Jerusalem Faculty of Medicine - Doctor of Medicine (2005) and Bachelor of Medical Sciences (2001). He earned a Masters of Public Health at Tel Aviv University (2012). He studied for an MBA at Ono Academic College.

Career 
He was a physician at Western Galilee Hospital.

Select publications
 Kopel E, Davidovitch N, Levine H. Using All Means to Protect Public Health in Israel From Emerging Tobacco Products. Am J Public Health. 2017 Oct;107(10):1599-1600. doi: 10.2105/AJPH.2017.304016. PMID 28902544; PMCID: PMC5607691.
 Kopel, Eran et al. The Israeli public health response to wild polio virus importation.

External links
ResearchGate
ORCID

References

Living people
Israeli epidemiologists
The Hebrew University-Hadassah Medical School alumni
Tel Aviv University alumni
Ono Academic College alumni
Israeli public health doctors
Year of birth missing (living people)
Academic staff of Tel Aviv University